Portea kermesina ('kermesina'=crimson)  is a plant species in the genus Portea in the bromeliad family.

The bromeliad is endemic to the Atlantic Forest biome (Mata Atlantica Brasileira) and to Bahia state, located in southeastern Brazil.

it grows near rivers at sea level. It is a critically endangered species.

Description

The plant produces a flower spike with "large, rose bracts and blue-petaled flowers."

Porteas from Brazil are some of the most decorative. Portea kermesina has apple green leaves and thrives in diffused light.

References

kermesina
Endemic flora of Brazil
Flora of Bahia
Flora of the Atlantic Forest
Critically endangered flora of South America